Mill Run is an unincorporated community and census-designated place (CDP) in Blair County, Pennsylvania, United States. It was first listed as a CDP prior to the 2020 census.

The CDP is in western  Blair County, south of the center of Logan Township. It is bordered to the east by the city of Altoona and is often considered a neighborhood of the city. The community is in the valley of Mill Run, a stream which comes off the Allegheny Front  to the west and flows southeast, then south, to join Beaverdam Creek west of Hollidaysburg. Mill Run is part of the watershed of the Frankstown Branch Juniata River, leading to the Susquehanna.

Demographics

References 

Census-designated places in Blair County, Pennsylvania
Census-designated places in Pennsylvania